The 2006 Arena Football League season was the 20th season of the Arena Football League. The league champions were the Chicago Rush, who defeated the Orlando Predators in ArenaBowl XX.

In the aftermath of Hurricane Katrina, the New Orleans VooDoo franchise suspended operations before the start of the season.  However, the league added two teams, the Kansas City Brigade and the Utah Blaze, expanding to 18 teams. The AFL also expanded its playoff format to 12 teams with six teams per conference.

Standings

 Green indicates clinched playoff berth
 Purple indicates division champion
 Grey indicates division champion and conference's best record

Source: ArenaFan.com

Playoffs
All games televised by NBC, except when noted.

All-Arena team

External links
 AFL's 20 Greatest Highlights Countdown at ArenaFootball.com

References